Aphrissa fluminensis, the Rio de Janeiro sulphur, is a butterfly in the family Pieridae. It is found in Costa Rica, Brazil (Rio de Janeiro, Amazonas), and Peru.

References

Coliadinae
Butterflies of Central America
Pieridae of South America
Lepidoptera of Brazil
Fauna of the Amazon
Butterflies described in 1921